The following outline is provided as an overview of and topical guide to San Marino:

San Marino – small sovereign country located in the Apennine Mountains on the Italian Peninsula in Southern Europe.  San Marino is a landlocked enclave, surrounded by Italy. One of the European microstates, San Marino has the smallest population of all the members of the Council of Europe and the 3rd highest GDP per capita in the world.

San Marino claims to be the oldest constitutional republic in the world, founded on 3 September 301, by Marinus of Rab, a Christian stonemason fleeing the religious persecution of Roman Emperor Diocletian. San Marino's constitution, dating back to 1600, is the world's oldest written constitution still in effect.

General reference 

 Pronunciation:
 Common English country name:  San Marino
 Official English country name:  The Republic of San Marino
 Common endonym(s):  
 Official endonym(s):  
 Adjectival(s): Sammarinese
 Demonym(s): Sammarinese
 Etymology: Name of San Marino
 ISO country codes:  SM, SMR, 674
 ISO region codes:  See ISO 3166-2:SM
 Internet country code top-level domain:  .sm

Geography of San Marino 

Geography of San Marino
 San Marino is: a landlocked country and a European microstate
 Location:
 Eastern Hemisphere
 Northern Hemisphere
 Eurasia
 Europe (outline)
 Southern Europe
 Italian Peninsula
 Surrounded by Italy
 Time zone:  Central European Time (UTC+01), Central European Summer Time (UTC+02)
 Extreme points of San Marino
 High:  Monte Titano 
 Low:  Ausa River 
 Land boundaries:   39 km
 Coastline:  none
 Population of San Marino: 30,800 (January 1, 2008)  - 206th most populous country
 Sammarinese
 Area of San Marino: 61 km2
 Atlas of San Marino

Environment of San Marino 

 Climate of San Marino
 Geology of San Marino
 Protected areas of San Marino
 Wildlife of San Marino
 Fauna of San Marino
 Birds of San Marino
 Mammals of San Marino

Natural geographic features of San Marino 

 Mountains of San Marino
 Monte Titano
 Rivers of San Marino
 Ausa (river)
 Cando (river)
 Fiumicello (river)
 San Marino (river)
 World Heritage Sites in San Marino: None

Demography of San Marino 

Demographics of San Marino

Government and politics of San Marino 
 
Politics of San Marino
 Form of government:
 Capital of San Marino: San Marino
 Elections in San Marino
 Political parties in San Marino

Branches of the government of San Marino 

Government of San Marino

Executive branch of the government of San Marino 
Captains Regent
Congress of State

Legislative branch of the government of San Marino 

Grand and General Council

Judicial branch of the government of San Marino 

Judiciary of San Marino

Foreign relations of San Marino 

Foreign relations of San Marino
 Diplomatic missions in San Marino
 Diplomatic missions of San Marino
 Italy–San Marino relations
 San Marino–Serbia relations
 San Marino–United Kingdom relations
 San Marino–United States relations

International organization membership 
The Most Serene Republic of San Marino is a member of:

Council of Europe (CE)
Food and Agriculture Organization (FAO)
International Bank for Reconstruction and Development (IBRD)
International Civil Aviation Organization (ICAO)
International Criminal Court (ICCt)
International Criminal Police Organization (Interpol)
International Federation of Red Cross and Red Crescent Societies (IFRCS)
International Labour Organization (ILO)
International Maritime Organization (IMO)
International Monetary Fund (IMF)
International Olympic Committee (IOC)
International Organization for Migration (IOM) (observer)
International Red Cross and Red Crescent Movement (ICRM)
International Telecommunication Union (ITU)

International Trade Union Confederation (ITUC)
Inter-Parliamentary Union (IPU)
Organization for Security and Cooperation in Europe (OSCE)
Organisation for the Prohibition of Chemical Weapons (OPCW)
Unione Latina
United Nations (UN)
United Nations Conference on Trade and Development (UNCTAD)
United Nations Educational, Scientific, and Cultural Organization (UNESCO)
Universal Postal Union (UPU)
World Federation of Trade Unions (WFTU)
World Health Organization (WHO)
World Intellectual Property Organization (WIPO)
World Tourism Organization (UNWTO)

Law and order in San Marino 

Law of San Marino
 Capital punishment in San Marino
 Constitution of San Marino
 Human rights in San Marino
 Abortion in San Marino
 LGBT rights in San Marino
 Freedom of religion in San Marino
 Law enforcement in San Marino
 Carcere dei Cappuccini
Civil Police

Military of San Marino 

Military of San Marino
 Military ranks of San Marino

History of San Marino 

History of San Marino
 Battle of San Marino

Culture of San Marino 

Culture of San Marino
 Architecture of San Marino
 Art in San Marino
 Art in San Marino
 Cinema of San Marino
 Literature of San Marino
 Music of San Marino
 Theatre in San Marino
 Cuisine of San Marino
 Sammarinese wine
 Torta Tre Monti
 Festivals in San Marino
 Languages of San Marino
 Media in San Marino
Newspapers in San Marino
 Television in San Marino
 National symbols of San Marino
 Coat of arms of San Marino
 Flag of San Marino
 National anthem of San Marino
 People of San Marino
 Public holidays in San Marino
 Religion in San Marino
 Christianity in San Marino
 Islam in San Marino
 Judaism in San Marino
 World Heritage Sites in San Marino: None

Sports in San Marino 

Sports in San Marino
 Football in San Marino
 San Marino at the Olympics

Economy and infrastructure of San Marino 

Economy of San Marino
 Economic rank, by nominal GDP (2007): 166th (one hundred and sixty sixth)
 Agriculture in San Marino
 Banking in San Marino
 Central Bank of San Marino
 National Bank of San Marino
 Communications in San Marino
 Internet in San Marino
 Poste San Marino
 Telecom Italia San Marino

Currency of San Marino: Euro (see also: Euro topics)
 Sammarinese euro coins
 Previous currency: Sammarinese lira
ISO 4217: EUR
 Energy in San Marino
 Health care in San Marino
 Tourism in San Marino
 Museums in San Marino
 Visa policy of San Marino
 Transport in San Marino
 Aerial cable car
 Airports in San Marino
 Rail transport in San Marino
 Roads in San Marino

Education in San Marino 

Education in San Marino
Scuola Superiore di Studi Storici di San Marino

See also 
Index of San Marino–related articles
List of international rankings
Member state of the United Nations
Outline of geography

References

External links 

CIA World Factbook: San Marino
 
Meteo San Marino - Center Of Meteorology and Climatology — Local Forecast and Webcams of San Marino
Musei di Stato della Repubblica di San Marino
 Secretary of State for External Relations and Politics
History of San Marino: Primary Documents
Visit San Marino - Official San Marino Tourism Site Contrada Omagnano
 General information of San Marino: Politics, Institutions and very other
San Marino: excerpt from a 1769 Guidebook
Renata Tebaldi International Voice Competition
San Marino Info
Centro Meteorologico Sammarinese - Weather Forecast Center, Real time Weather Stations Measurements and Webcams from San Marino

San Marino
Outline
Outline